The Tanna fruit dove (Ptilinopus tannensis) is a species of bird in the family Columbidae. It is endemic to Vanuatu.

Its natural habitats are subtropical or tropical moist lowland forest, subtropical or tropical moist montane forest, and heavily degraded former forest.

References

Birds of Vanuatu
Ptilinopus
Birds described in 1790
Endemic fauna of Vanuatu
Taxonomy articles created by Polbot